The Palaeonisciformes (Palaeoniscida) are an extinct order of early ray-finned fishes (Actinopterygii). Palaeonisciformes sensu lato first appeared in the fossil record in the Late Silurian and last appeared in the Late Cretaceous. The name is derived from the Ancient Greek words παλαιός (palaiós, ancient) and ὀνίσκος (oniskos,  'cod-fish' or woodlouse), probably pertaining to the organization of the fishes' scales, similar to the exoskeletal plating of woodlice.

In an early interpretation of the group, the Palaeonisciformes are divided in two suborders: Palaeoniscoidei (includes Palaeoniscum and fossil taxa with a broadly similar appearance) and Platysomoidei (includes Platysomus and other deep-bodied early actinopterygians). These groupings are considered paraphyletic today. In the cladistic sense, Palaeonisciformes sensu stricto should only refer to the Permian Palaeoniscum, the name giving taxon, and all other taxa that fall on the same lineage as Palaeoniscum. 

Additionally, the term Palaeopterygii ("ancient fins") is sometimes used to group fossil and extant actinopterygians that are neither members of the monophyletic Neopterygii nor the also monophyletic Cladistia. Like the Palaeonisciformes sensu lato, the Palaeopterygii are also a paraphyletic assemblage.

Historic background

The systematics of fossil and extant fishes has puzzled ichthyologists since the time of Louis Agassiz, who first grouped all Palaeozoic ray-finned fishes together with Chondrostei (sturgeons, paddlefishes), gars, lungfishes, and acanthodians in his Ganoidei. Carl Hermann Müller later proposed to divide actinopterygians into three groups: Chondrostei, Holostei, and Teleostei. Later, Edward Drinker Cope included these three groups within Actinopteri. The same classification is also used today, though the definitions of these groups have changed significantly over the years. The sister group to Actinopteri are the Cladistia, which include Polypterus (bichirs), Erpetoichthys and their fossil relatives. All together are grouped as Actinopterygii. 

A few additional classification schemes were proposed over the years. Lev Berg erected the superorder Palaeonisci, in which he included early actinopterygians that belonged to neither Chondrostei nor Polypteri (Cladistia). Mostly following Berg, Jean-Pierre Lehman grouped the Actinopterygii into 26 orders, among others the Palaeonisciformes with the two suborders Palaeoniscoidei and Platysomoidei. 

Numerous genera of early actinopterygians have been referred to either Palaeonisciformes or to one of its suborders based on superficial resemblance with either Palaeoniscum (Palaeoniscoidei) or Platysomus (Platysomoidei), especially during the early and middle parts of the 20th century. Palaeonisciformes, Palaeoniscoidei, and Platysomoidei have therefore become wastebasket taxa. They are not natural groups, but instead paraphyletic assemblages of the early members of several ray-finned fish lineages. Palaeoniscoidei have traditionally encompassed most Paleozoic actinopterygians, except those that exhibit atypical body forms (such as the deep-bodied Platysomoidei, or those assigned securely to any of the living groups of ray-finned fishes. The same can also be said about the family Palaeoniscidae sensu lato, to which several genera not closely related to Palaeoniscum have been referred in the past. 

The grouping of "palaeonisciforms" was based largely on shared plesiomorphic features, such as the forward position of the eye, the large gape or the presence of rhombic scales. However, such symplesiomorphies are not informative with regard to phylogeny, but rather an indication of common ancestry. In modern biology, taxonomists group taxa based on shared apomorphies (synapomorphies) in order to detect monophyletic groups (natural groups). They use computer software (e.g., PAUP) to determine the most likely evolutionary relationships between taxa, thereby putting previous hypotheses of such relationships to the test. As a consequence, many genera have been subsequently removed from Palaeonisciformes and referred to distinct orders (e.g., Saurichthyiformes).

The term Palaeonisciformes has mostly disappeared from the modern literature or is nowadays only used to refer to the "primitive" morphology of a taxon (e.g., "palaeonisciform skull shape" or "palaeoniscoid body shape"). In order to make the Paleonisciformes, Palaeoniscoidei or Palaeoniscidae monophyletic, these terms should only be used in a strict sense, i.e., when referring to the clade of actinopterygians that includes Palaeoniscum and the taxa closely related to it. 

A monophyletic clade including several taxa classically referred to the Palaeonisciformes (e.g., Aesopichthys, Birgeria, Boreosomus, Canobius, Pteronisculus, Rhadinichthys) was recovered in the cladistic analysis by Lund et al. This clade, coined Palaeoniscimorpha, is also used in subsequent publications. Recent cladistic analyses also recovered clades containing several genera that have historically been grouped within Palaeonisciformes, while excluding others. Due to the delicate nature of fossils of ray-finned fishes and the incomplete knowledge of several taxa (especially with regard to the internal cranial anatomy), there is still no consensus about the evolutionary relationships of several early actinopterygians previously grouped within Palaeonisciformes.

Classification
The following list includes species that have been referred to Palaeonisciformes (or Palaeoniscidae, respectively), usually because of superficial resemblance with Palaeoniscum freieslebeni. Many of these species are poorly known and have never been included in any cladistic analysis. Their inclusion in Palaeonisciformes (or Palaeoniscidae) is in most cases doubtful and requires confirmation by cladistic studies. Which taxa should be included in Palaeonisciformes sensu stricto (or Palaeoniscidae sensu stricto) and which ones moved to other orders or families, respecitively, is a matter of ongoing research. 

 Order †Palaeonisciformes Hay, 1902 sensu stricto [Palaeoniscida Moy-Thomas & Miles, 1971]
 Family †Palaeoniscidae Vogt, 1852
 Genus ?†Agecephalichthys Wade, 1935
 Species †Agecephalichthys granulatus Wade, 1935
 Genus ?†Atherstonia Woodward, 18989 [Broometta Chabakov, 1927]
 Species †Atherstonia scutata Woodward, 1889 [Atherstonia cairncrossi Broom, 1913; Amblypterus capensis Broom, 1913; Broometta cairncrossi Chabakov, 1927]
 Species †Atherstonia minor Woodward, 1893
 Genus ?†Cryphaeiolepis Traquair, 1881
 Species †Cryphaeiolepis scutata Traquair, 1881
 Genus ?†Cteniolepidotrichia Poplin & Su, 1992
 Species †Cteniolepidotrichia turfanensis Poplin & Su, 1992
 Genus †Dicellopyge Brough, 1931
 Species †Dicellopyge macrodentata Brough, 1931
 Species †Dicellopyge lissocephalus Brough, 1931
 Genus ?†Duwaichthys Liu et al., 1990
 Species †Duwaichthys mirabilis Liu et al., 1990
 Genus ?†Ferganiscus Sytchevskaya & Yakolev, 1999
 Species †Ferganiscus osteolepis Sytchevskaya & Yakolev, 1999
 Genus †Gyrolepis Agassiz, 1833 non Kade, 1858
 Species †G. albertii Agassiz, 1833
 Species †G. gigantea Agassiz, 1833
 Species †G. maxima Agassiz, 1833
 Species †G. quenstedti Dames, 1888
 Species †G. tenuistriata Agassiz, 1833
 Genus †Gyrolepidoides Cabrera, 1944
 Species †G. creyanus Schaeffer, 1955
 Species †G. cuyanus Cabrera, 1944
 Species †G. multistriatus Rusconi, 1948
 Genus ?†Palaeoniscinotus Rohon, 1890
 Species †P. czekanowskii Rohon, 1890
 Genus †Palaeoniscum de Blainville, 1818  [Palaeoniscus Agassiz, 1833 non Von Meyer, 1858; Palaeoniscas Rzchak, 1881; Eupalaeoniscus Rzchak, 1881; Palaeomyzon Weigelt, 1930; Geomichthys Sauvage, 1888]
 Species †P. angustum (Rzehak, 1881) [Palaeoniscas angustus Rzehak, 1881]
 Species †P. antipodeum (Egerton, 1864) [Palaeoniscus antipodeus Egerton, 1864]
 Species †P. antiquum Williams, 1886
 Species †P. arenaceum Berger, 1832
 Species †P. capense (Bloom, 1913) [Palaeoniscus capensis Bloom, 1913]
 Species †P. comtum (Agassiz, 1833) [Palaeoniscus comtus Agassiz, 1833]
 Species †P. daedalium Yankevich & Minich, 1998
 Species †P. devonicum Clarke, 1885
 Species †P. elegans (Sedgwick, 1829) [Palaeoniscus elegans Sedgwick, 1829]
 Species †P. freieslebeni de Blainville, 1818 [Eupalaeoniscus freieslebeni (de Brainville, 1818); Palaeoniscus freieslebeni (de Brainville, 1818)]
 Species †P. hassiae (Jaekel, 1898) [Galeocerdo contortus hassiae Jaekel, 1898; Palaeomyzon hassiae (Jaekel, 1898)]
 Species †P. kasanense Geinitz & Vetter, 1880
 Species †P. katholitzkianum (Rzehak, 1881) [Palaeoniscas katholitzkianus Rzehak, 1881]
 Species †P. landrioti (le Sauvage, 1890) [Palaeoniscus landrioti le Sauvage, 1890]
 Species †P. longissimum (Agassiz, 1833) [Palaeoniscus longissimus Agassiz, 1833]
 Species †P. macrophthalmum (McCoy, 1855) [Palaeoniscus macrophthalmus McCoy, 1855]
 Species †P. magnum (Woodward, 1937) [Palaeoniscus magnus Woodward, 1937]
 Species †P. moravicum (Rzehak, 1881) [Palaeoniscas moravicus Rzehak, 1881]
 Species †P. promtu (Rzehak, 1881) [Palaeoniscas promtus Rzehak, 1881]
 Species †P. reticulatum Williams, 1886
 Species †P. scutigerum Newberry, 1868
 Species †P. vratislavensis (Agassiz, 1833) [Palaeoniscus vratislavensis Agassiz, 1833]
 Genus †Palaeothrissum de Blainville, 1818
 Species †P. elegans Sedgwick, 1829
 Species †P. macrocephalum de Blainville, 1818
 Species †P. magnum de Blainville, 1818
 Genus ?†Shuniscus Su, 1983
 Species †Shuniscus longianalis Su, 1983
 Genus ?†Suchonichthys Minich, 2001
 Species †Suchonichthys molini Minich, 2001
 Genus ?†Trachelacanthus Fischer De Waldheim, 1850
 Species †Trachelacanthus stschurovskii Fischer De Waldheim, 1850
 Genus ?†Triassodus Su, 1984
 Species †Triassodus yanchangensis Su, 1984
 Genus ?†Turfania Liu & Martínez, 1973
 Species †T. taoshuyuanensis Liu & Martínez, 1973
 Species †T. varta Wang, 1979
 Genus ?†Turgoniscus Jakovlev, 1968
 Species †Turgoniscus reissi Jakovlev, 1968
 Genus ?†Weixiniscus Su & Dezao, 1994
 Species †Weixiniscus microlepis Su & Dezao, 1994
 Genus ?†Xingshikous Liu, 1988
 Species †Xingshikous xishanensis Liu, 1988
 Genus ?†Yaomoshania Poplin et al., 1991
 Species †Yaomoshania minutosquama Poplin et al., 1991

Other families attributed to Palaeonisciformes
This list includes families that at one time or another were placed in the order Palaeonisciformes. The species included in these families are often poorly known, and a close relationship with the family Palaeoniscidae is therefore doubtful unless confirmed by cladistic analyses. These families are therefore better treated as Actinopterygii incertae sedis for the time being. The evolutionary relationships of early actinopterygians is a matter of ongoing studies.

 †Acropholidae Kazantseva-Selezneva, 1977
 †Atherstoniidae Gardiner, 1969
 †Brazilichthyidae Cox & Hutchinson, 1991
 †Centrolepididae Gardier, 1960
 †Coccolepididae Berg, 1940 corrig.
 †Commentryidae Gardiner, 1963
 †Cryphiolepididae MoyThomas, 1939 corrig.
 †Dwykiidae Gardiner, 1969
 †Holuridae Moy-Thomas, 1939
 †Igornichthyidae Heyler, 1977
 †Irajapintoseidae Beltan, 1978
 †Monesedeiphidae Beltan, 1989
 †Moythomasiidae Kazantseva, 1971
 †Rhabdolepididae Gardiner, 1963
 †Stegotrachelidae Gardiner, 1963
 †Thrissonotidae Berg, 1955
 †Tienshaniscidae Lu & Chen, 2010
 †Turseodontidae Bock, 1959 corrig.
 †Uighuroniscidae Jin, 1996
 †Urosthenidae Woodward, 1931

Timeline of genera
Andreolepis hedei, previously grouped within Palaeonisciformes, has proven so far to be the earliest-known actinopterygiian, living around 420 million years ago (Late Silurian in Russia, Sweden, Estonia, and Latvia. Actinopterygians underwent an extensive diversification during the Carboniferous, after the end-Devonian Hangenberg extinction.

References

External links

Palaeonisciformes at University of Bristol

 
Prehistoric ray-finned fish orders
Paraphyletic groups